KIMP (960 AM) is a terrestrial American radio station, paired with an FM translator, and broadcasting a Regional Mexican format. Licensed to Mount Pleasant, Texas, United States, the station is owned by East Texas Broadcasting, Inc.

Translator

References

External links

IMP
News and talk radio stations in the United States